"Sunny Summer" is a song recorded by South Korean girl group GFriend for their seventh extended play of the same name. The song was released by Source Music on July 19, 2018 as the EP title track.

Composition 
The song was written and produced by Duble Sidekick and Black Edition. It was described by Billboard's Tamar Herman, as a "bright synth-pop track overflowing with rollicking brass and funky percussion". Lyrically, it is  full of nuanced wordplay that incorporate the names of each of the six members.

Chart performance 
The song debuted at number 23 on the Gaon Digital Chart, on the week of July 21, 2018. In its second week, the song peaked at number 11. The song charted for 12 consecutive weeks in the Top 100. "Sunny Summer" also debuted at number 25 on the Kpop Hot 100 for the week of July 22, 2018. In its second week, the song peaked at number 10, staying for two consecutive weeks.

The song was the 42nd best-selling song in July, 19th in August and 66th in September 2018.

Music video 
A music video for the song was also released on July 19, 2018. The music video starts with a quote from William Shakespeare's’ Sonnet 43. It also shows segments of hand-waving choreography with clips of the group spending their summer having fun together.

Charts

References 

2018 songs
2018 singles
GFriend songs
Korean-language songs
Kakao M singles
Music videos directed by Lumpens
Hybe Corporation singles